The Artifact Gallery was an art gallery located in Tel Aviv, Israel, which featured local artists. It was established in 1986 by Sergio Edelsztein. It closed in 1996 and the archival material was later donated to the Information Center for Israeli Art at the Israel Museum, Jerusalem.

History

The Artifact Gallery was established in 1986 by Sergio Edelsztein. It was originally located in the Red House, an industrial building on Nahmani Street in Tel Aviv that formerly housed the Lodzia textile factory. Five years later, the gallery moved to the Noga neighborhood in Jaffa. 

Artifact gallery showcased the work of leading Israeli artists, among them Diti Almog, Philip Rantzer, Yitzhak Livne, Hila Lulu Lin, David Reeb, Larry Abramson, Asad Azi and Joshua Borkovsky. The gallery was one of the first in the country to provide exhibition space for video art installations. It closed in 1996.

In 2013, Edelstein donated the archive of Artifact Gallery, which includes archival material on Israeli artists, to the Information Center for Israeli Art at the Israel Museum, Jerusalem.

Partial list of artists featured in the gallery
 Larry Abramson
 Diti Almog 
 Asad Azi
 Dganit Berest
 Joshua Borkovsky
 Pinchas Cohen Gan
 Daniel Davis
 Atzmon Ganor
 Moshe Gershuni
 Tamar Getter
 Michael Gitlin
 Menashe Kadishman
 Yitzhak Livne
 Hila Lulu Lin
 Michal Na'aman
 Joshua Neustein
 Philip Rantzer 
 David Reeb
 Nahum Tevet
 Micha Ullman
 Bahar Artan Oskay

References

External links
 "The Artifact Gallery Archives". Information Center for Israeli Art. Israel Museum. Retrieved February 2015
 The Information Center for Israeli Art at the Israel Museum

Art museums and galleries in Israel
Art galleries established in 1986
1986 establishments in Israel